The Forks of the Road Market was a slave market in Natchez, Mississippi. It was largely developed by John Armfield and Isaac Franklin, who in 1833 capitalized on the difference in slave prices in the middle Atlantic states of Virginia and Maryland and the deep south. Using their company,  Franklin and Armfield, they purchased inexpensive slaves in the Middle Atlantic, and transported them to markets in New Orleans and Natchez for sale. Many of the slaves were transported overland from Tennessee via caravans which were known as coffles. During the winter months, many were transported by sea in extremely crowded quarters; this method was not effective in the summer as the overcrowded slaves were overcome by the heat and died.

The Forks of the Road market was located about a mile from downtown Natchez at the intersection of the ironically named Liberty Road and Washington Road, which has since been renamed to D’Evereux Drive in one direction and St. Catherine Street in the other. The market differed from many other slave sellers of the day by offering individuals on a first-come first-serve basis rather than selling them at auction, either singly or in lots.

At one time the Forks of the Road was the second largest slave market in the United States, trailing only New Orleans.

In 2021 the site was made one of four sites comprising the Natchez National Historical Park.

References

History of slavery in Mississippi
Buildings and structures in Natchez, Mississippi
Natchez National Historical Park
Slave pens